Wisr (ASX: WZR) is an Australian non-bank lender offering consumer lending services. It was known for being the first company of its type to be publicly listed in Australia. In March 2018, DirectMoney launched a major company rebrand to Wisr.

History 
In March 2018 DirectMoney Finance Pty Ltd rebranded to Wisr Finance Pty Ltd and began an entirely new business model. In 2017 the company had ceased peer-to-peer lending, originating a wholesale off-balance sheet loan funding facility with 255 Finance.

In August 2018, Wisr launched Australia's first credit score comparison site, WisrCredit.

In March 2019, the company launched the Wisr App, Australia's first app that lets the user round-up digital spare change to pay down debt such as credit cards.

In March 2019, Wisr undertook a $15 million capital raise through Placement shares.

In November 2019, the NAB-backed Wisr Warehouse loan funding facility went live with an initial $50 million commitment. The Wisr Warehouse was increased from $95 million to $150 million in July 2020, $250 million in October 2020 and then $350 million in March 2021.

In January 2020, Wisr undertook a $36.5 million capital raise through Placement shares and a share purchase plan (SPP).

In March 2021, Wisr took a 5% ownership in EU-based fintech Arbor.

In May 2021, Wisr undertook an inaugural A$225M ABS transaction (asset-backed securities), supported by a pool of fully amortising unsecured consumer personal loans. The top tranche of the ABS transaction received a AAA Moody's rating.

In June 2021, supported by Goldman Sachs, Wisr undertook a $55 million capital raise through Placement shares and a share purchase plan (SPP). It was oversubscribed.

Listing 
On 13 July 2015, Wisr listed on the Australian Securities Exchange through a reverse takeover of Basper Ltd, raising $AU11.2m at 20c per share.

See also
 Peer-to-peer lending

References 

Peer-to-peer lending companies
Companies listed on the Australian Securities Exchange